Arhopala bazalus, the powdered oakblue, is a lycaenid or blue butterfly first described by William Chapman Hewitson in 1852. It is found in Myanmar, mainland China, India (Assam, kerala and Sikkim), Indochina, Japan, the Philippines, and Taiwan.

References

External links
 With images.

Arhopala
Butterflies of Asia
Butterflies of Indochina
Butterflies described in 1852
Taxa named by William Chapman Hewitson